Nicolò Pasqualigo (27 July 1770 - 13 January 1821) was an Italian navy officer and a Venetian patrician who served in the navies of the Most Serene Republic of Venice, the Kingdom of Italy and the Austrian Empire.

Biography

A son of Venice
He started his service on board of the galleys of the Venetian Navy as nobile di nave (a rank roughly equal to Midshipman in the contemporary Royal Navy), when almost all the young men of his social class tried the best they could to avoid the perils of the military career, both on land or at the sea. Shortly after, he asked and obtained to be transferred on board of the Armada Grossa, the sailing warships' Division of Venice, and distinguished himself under the command of Angelo Emo in 1788, during the victorious campaign against the Bey of Tunis.

Subsequently, he was awarded with the rank of sopra-comito (commander of a galley) in Dalmatia. In this position he was surprised by the surrender of Venice in 1797.

The Italian Kingdom
In 1810 he distinguished himself in the first Franco-Italian attempt to conquer the island of Lissa. In the following year he was the commander, with the rank of Corvette Captain, of the Italian frigate Corona, a fifth rate ship of 40 guns. During the battle he engaged HMS Cerberus in a short-range duel, inflicting heavy damage to the enemy but receiving equal; the wreck of the French frigate Favorite with the death of Commodore Dubourdieu and the arrival of  forced him to follow in the retreat to the east the frigates Danaé and Carolina. The Active, the only British ship still in fighting condition, quickly reached the Corona at 12.30 in the small channel between Lissa and the little island of Spalmadon. At 14.30, after a 45 minutes fight resulting in a fire that broke up aboard of his ship, he was forced to strike his color in surrender.

References

1770 births
1821 deaths
18th-century Italian military personnel
Italian military personnel of the Napoleonic Wars
18th-century Venetian people
Italian military personnel in Austrian armies